James Osborne may refer to:
James Osborne (politician) (1845–1877), New South Wales parliamentarian
James Osborne (VC) (1857–1928), English recipient of the Victoria Cross
James Osborne (sport shooter), British field target shooter
James T. A. Osborne, British painter, printmaker, etcher and engraver
Jim Osborne (American football) (born 1949), former American football defensive tackle
Jim Osborne (tennis) (born 1945), American tennis player
Jimmy Osborne (died 2002), Australian association footballer
Jamie Osborne (jockey) (born 1967), jockey and race horse trainer
 Jamie Osborne (rugby union), Irish rugby union player
Jamey Osborne (born 1992), English footballer